The marbled salamander (Ambystoma opacum) is a species of mole salamander found in the eastern United States.

Description 
The marbled salamander is a stocky and boldly banded salamander. The marbled salamander exhibits sexual dimorphism with bands of females tending to be gray, while those of males are more white. Juveniles do not have any bands and have white flecks instead.  Adults can grow to about 11 cm (4 in), small compared to other members of its genus. Like most of the mole salamanders, it is secretive, spending most of its life under logs or in burrows.

Habitat and range 
Marbled salamanders are found in the eastern United States, from southern New England to northern Florida, and west to Illinois and Texas. They have been found as far north as New Hampshire, though only two sightings have been reported there. Their habitats are damp woodlands, forests, and places with soft and wet soil. Seasonally flooded areas are essential for breeding, but the salamanders do not normally enter the water. Like many salamanders, marbled salamanders have poison glands to deter predators.

The marbled salamander is the state salamander of North Carolina.

Lifecycle and reproduction

Lifecycle

The first months that Marbled Salamanders spend living out of the water are the most important in determining how many will survive until the next breeding season. Marbled Salamanders are not strong burrowers, therefore they rely on existing holes in the ground for shelter. Desiccation, heat stress, soil moisture, temperature, and pH are all important factors in determining if a Marbled Salamander will survive. Chances of survival are low for Marbled Salamanders who travel through fields, however, they have been observed to traverse fields in order to find other pond areas. Marbled Salamanders survive best in a forest habitat, compared to an open field. Protecting wetlands is key to the survival of this species. Conservationists recommend leaving a buffer zone of forest around wetlands to increase survivorship of Marbled Salamanders. Marbled Salamanders in the northern portions of their range can also go into a state of torpor to survive the cold months. 

Adults spend most of their time in their burrows or under logs, as is the case with most mole salamanders. Juvenile marbled salamanders hatch early compared to most salamanders and gain a size advantage by feeding and growing for several months before the Jefferson salamanders and spotted salamanders hatch later in the spring. Larvae typically mature as quickly as two months in the southern part of their range, but take up to six months to mature in the northern part.
Marbled salamanders, like other members of this genus, are reported to have relatively long life spans, 8–10 years or more.

Reproduction
Courtship of this species takes place on land. The males will compete by butting heads and blocking another male’s movement with its tail. When courting the female, a male will nudge the vent of a female with its snout, with the intent that the female will respond in kind. This back-and-forth nudging has the appearance of a dance as the two salamanders circle around one another. This display culminates with the male depositing a spermatophore and the female moving to take it into her cloaca. The female will then lay between 50 and 200 eggs, often remaining with them until the nest floods. One fairly unique parental care behavioral characteristic of Marbled Salamanders is that when the mothers do stay with their eggs, they wrap their bodies around the eggs to form a bowl shape. They do this when rain is coming to collect water over the eggs. For this species, water via rainfall or rising pond water levels must make extended contact with the eggs in order for them to begin hatching.

However, it has been observed that females may abandon their eggs before flooding occurs. Female Marbled Salamanders have a very low attachment to their eggs, and they will abandon their nest after a disturbance. They have also been observed to abandon undisturbed nests. When the mother leaves the nest, she leaves the eggs vulnerable to predation by other salamanders, frogs, and beetles.

Reproductive success is highly variable for the Marbled Salamander. Some years many juveniles will survive, while other years the breeding population may experience a catastrophic failure, and very few juveniles will survive. These catastrophic failures occur randomly, but it has been found that they are mainly influenced by the length of the hydroperiod. A short hydroperiod is the main cause of catastrophic failure. Because Marbled Salamanders have relatively long life spans, their chances of extinction due to catastrophic failure are low. If they do not breed successfully one year, they will be alive the next year to try again. However, if there are other complications affecting their survival, the possibility of a catastrophic failure poses a larger threat to the overall population. Surviving on land, outside of the reproduction season, is very important to keep the population stable.

While most Marbled Salamanders return to the pond where they were born to breed, some may travel over 1,000 meters to locate a new pond to breed. This often occurs when their natal pond has a small population that may not have a large selection of mates. This dispersal helps populations of Marbled Salamanders to avoid genetic problems, by introducing new genes into the population. This dispersal also means that it is important to view these populations as a larger metapopulation, rather than focusing simply on a single wetland area.

Larval salamanders have been found to be positively phototactic until fully developing their rear legs, at which point they switch and become negatively phototactic.

Feeding 

Adults take terrestrial invertebrates, such as worms, insects, centipedes, other arthropods, and mollusks (snails, slugs). Larvae take small aquatic animals (zooplankton, mainly copepods and cladocerans), but larger individuals will take larger crustaceans (isopods, fairy shrimp), aquatic insects, snails, oligochaete worms, and eggs and larvae of other amphibians, as well.

Marbled Salamanders are considered a keystone predator because they alter the competitive ability of their prey, allowing other species of prey to thrive.

Predator avoidance 
When A. opacum is under attack by a predator, they often exhibit tail lashing, head-butting, body coiling, or potentially becoming immobile. These defensive moves are thought to draw attention to the tail, which has granular glands that produce noxious secretions to protect themselves. While some predators have learned to eat the body of Marbled Salamanders and leave the tail, this is still a deterrent for many predators. A problem with the granular glands Marbled Salamanders possess is that secretions are reduced after multiple attacks, making them more vulnerable

References

Further reading
Gravenhorst JLC. 1807. Vergleichende Uebersicht des Linneischen und einiger neuern zoologischen Systeme ... Nebst dem eingeschalteten Verzeichnisse der zoologischen Sammlung des Verfassers und den Beschreibungen neuer Thierarten, die in derselben sind. Göttingen: Heinrich Dieterich. xx + 476 pp. (Salamandra opaca, new species, p. 431). (in German).
Petranka, James W. (1998). Salamanders of the United States and Canada. Washington, District of Columbia: Smithsonian Books. 592 pp. .
Tyning, Thomas F. (1990). A Guide to Amphibians and Reptiles. Stokes Nature Guides. New York: Little, Brown and Company. 416 pp. .

External links 

 Animal Diversity Web
 Savannah River Ecology Laboratory
 USGS
 ITIS

Mole salamanders
Salamander, Marbled
Salamander, Marbled
Amphibians described in 1807
Taxa named by Johann Ludwig Christian Gravenhorst
Extant Pliocene first appearances
Symbols of North Carolina